George Edward Haynsworth (October 25, 1922 – November 24, 2012) served as a bishop in the Episcopal Church in El Salvador, Nicaragua, and the Episcopal Diocese of South Carolina. He was an alumnus of the Citadel (1940) and the University of the South.

References
Online obituary

1922 births
2012 deaths
The Citadel, The Military College of South Carolina alumni
20th-century American Episcopalians
Episcopal bishops of South Carolina
Anglican bishops of Nicaragua
Anglican bishops of El Salvador